The 1981–82 FIS Cross-Country World Cup was the first official  World Cup in cross-country skiing. It was arranged by the International Ski Federation (FIS). The 1981/82 World Cup started in Reit im Winkl,  West Germany on 9 January 1982 and finished in Kiruna, Sweden on 13 April 1982. Bill Koch of United States won the overall men's event, and Berit Aunli of Norway won the women's.

Calendar

NOTE: Races marked with (*) counts officially for both as "FIS World Cup" / "FIS Nordic World Ski Championships" wins statistics.

Men

Women

Men's relay

Women's relay

Overall standings

Men's standings

Women's standings

Achievements
Victories in this World Cup

Men
 , 4 first places
 , 2 first places
 , 1 first place
 , 1 first place
 , 1 first place
 , 1 first place

Women
 , 3 first places
 , 2 first places
 , 2 first place
 , 1 first place
 , 1 first place
 , 1 first place

FIS Cross-Country World Cup seasons
World Cup 1981-82
World Cup 1981-82